Saravareh-ye Vali Najafi (also Romanized as Sarāvareh-ye Vālī Najafī; also known as Sarāvareh and Sar Āvāreh) is a village in Posht Tang Rural District, in the Central District of Sarpol-e Zahab County, Kermanshah Province, Iran. At the 2006 census, its population was 125, in 24 families.

References 

Populated places in Sarpol-e Zahab County